Chapmansboro is an unincorporated community in Cheatham County, Tennessee, United States. Its ZIP code is 37035.

Notes

Unincorporated communities in Cheatham County, Tennessee
Unincorporated communities in Tennessee